The Bridge is a studio album by jazz saxophonist Sonny Rollins, recorded in 1962. It was Rollins' first release following a three-year sabbatical and was his first album for RCA Victor. The saxophonist was joined by the musicians with whom he recorded for the next segment of his career: Jim Hall on guitar, Bob Cranshaw on double bass and Ben Riley on drums.

History 
In 1959, feeling pressured by the unexpected swiftness of his rise to fame, Rollins took a three-year hiatus to focus on perfecting his craft. A resident of the Lower East Side of Manhattan with no private space to practice, he took his saxophone up to the Williamsburg Bridge (not the brooklyn bridge as depicted on the cd reissue cover)  to practice alone: "I would be up there 15 or 16 hours at a time spring, summer, fall and winter". His first recording after his return to performance took its name from those solo sessions. Critical reception to the album, which was not the revolutionary new jazz approach many expected, was mixed. Rollins, who had been considered groundbreaking in his thematic improvisations, was supplanted in critical buzz by the growing popularity of Ornette Coleman's free jazz.

Reception
If not a tremendous departure from Rollins' earlier style, the album was nevertheless quite successful. Tagged by AllMusic as "a near-classic", the recording was declared by Inkblot Magazine to be "one of the greatest albums from one of jazz's greatest musicians". It is one of the albums for which the long-active and prolific Rollins receives his greatest praise.

The album was inducted into the Grammy Hall of Fame in 2015.

Re-releases
The album was re-released in 1976 in Japan and 1977 in the U.S. It was relaunched in 1992 on CD by Bluebird/RCA/BMG and remastered from the original master tapes for CD in 2003 for the Bluebird First Editions series. It has also been issued many times in other formats, for example as an audiophile LP with 45 rpm (Classic Records, 2000).  It is also part of The Complete RCA Victor Recordings (1997).

Track listing 
 "Without a Song" (Edward Eliscu, Billy Rose, Vincent Youmans) – 7:26
 "Where Are You?" (Harold Adamson, Jimmy McHugh) – 5:10
 "John S." (Sonny Rollins) – 7:46
 "The Bridge" (Sonny Rollins) – 5:59
 "God Bless the Child" (Arthur Herzog Jr., Billie Holiday) – 7:27
 "You Do Something to Me" (Cole Porter) – 6:51

Personnel

Performance 
 Sonny Rollins – tenor saxophone
 Jim Hall – guitar
 Bob Cranshaw – bass
 Ben Riley – drums (all but track 5)
 Harry "H.T." Saunders – drums (track 5 only)

"God Bless the Child" recorded on January 30, 1962
"Where Are You?", "John S." and "You Do Something to Me" recorded on February 13, 1962
"Without a Song" and "The Bridge" on February 14, 1962

Production 
 Bob Prince – original session producer
 Ray Hall – engineer
 Chuck Stewart – cover photography
 George Avakian – liner notes

Production of the first CD Reissue, 1992 
 John Snyder – digital producer
 Steve Backer – executive producer
 Joe Lopes and Jay Newland – engineers
 Ira Gitler – liner notes (in addition to the original text by Avakian)

References 

Sonny Rollins albums
1962 albums
Bluebird Records albums
RCA Records albums
Albums produced by George Avakian